Cyr Plantation (French: Plantation Cyr) is a plantation in Aroostook County, Maine, United States. The population was 78 at the 2020 census.

History
Early settlers moved to what would become Cyr Plantation in the mid-1800s, then known as Township Letter L. Around that time, a road was built between the Aroostook River and Grand Falls, New Brunswick, Canada (which today stretches between Caribou, Maine and Hamlin, Maine). Many early inhabitants obtained grants to lots near the road and Hammond Brook to farm the land. The plantation was formally organized on March 12, 1870, and named after the many Cyrs in the area, including Andre Cyr and his father Christoper, the first Cyrs in Cyr Plantation.

Geography

Demographics

At the 2000 census there were 117 people in 42 households, including 33 families, in the plantation. The population density was 3.0 people per square mile (1.2/km). There were 51 housing units at an average density of 1.3 per square mile (0.5/km).  The racial makeup of the plantation was 94.02% White, and 5.98% from two or more races.
Of the 42 households 45.2% had children under the age of 18 living with them, 71.4% were married couples living together, 2.4% had a female householder with no husband present, and 21.4% were non-families. 16.7% of households were one person and 9.5% were one person aged 65 or older. The average household size was 2.79 and the average family size was 3.15.

The age distribution was 30.8% under the age of 18, 4.3% from 18 to 24, 29.9% from 25 to 44, 24.8% from 45 to 64, and 10.3% 65 or older. The median age was 40 years. For every 100 females, there were 88.7 males. For every 100 females age 18 and over, there were 107.7 males.

The median household income was $32,500 and the median family income was $31,429. Males had a median income of $23,333 versus $21,563 for females. The per capita income for the plantation was $10,836. There were 12.5% of families and 9.9% of the population living below the poverty line, including 5.0% of under eighteens and none of those over 64.

References

Plantations in Aroostook County, Maine
Plantations in Maine